The Atlantic surf clam (Spisula solidissima), also called the bar clam, hen clam, skimmer or simply sea clam, is a very large, edible, saltwater clam or marine bivalve mollusk in the family Mactridae. It is commonly found in the western Atlantic Ocean.

The shell of this species is a well-known object to beach-goers in the northeastern United States. People on the beach often pick up a large empty shell of this species, either to dig in the sand with, or take home to use as a decorative dish or ashtray.

The species is exported commercially as a food item.

Distribution
This common species occurs off the east coast of North America from Nova Scotia to South Carolina.

It has also been introduced and farmed in Hokkaidō, northern Japan.

Habitat
Atlantic surf clams live buried in coarse or fine sand. They live offshore as well as in the low intertidal and surf zones.

Life habits
Surf clams can take as little as three months to reach maturity off the New Jersey coast, or as long as four years off Nova Scotia, and can reach an age of 31 years.

These clams use their siphons to pull in and then filter fine particles of organic matter and plankton from the surrounding seawater. Like almost all clams, they are filter feeders.

Human use
This species is a commercially exploited species, long prized for its sweet flavor. This species is typically harvested from fishing vessels known as dredgers, which use a specialized fishing dredge equipped with high-power hydraulic jets designed to fluidize the sea floor so as to loosen clams from the sediments before it scoops them up.

About two-thirds of a surf clam's shucked weight is viable for human consumption. The meat of the clam is used as 'strips', chowder, and sushi.

The "tongue" or foot of the clam is commercially valuable because it is cut into long strips which are breaded and fried and served as clam strips, first popularized by the Howard Johnson's franchise.

The meat that is left over is separated from the "belly" and is referred to as "salvage" within the clam industry. This meat includes the adductor muscles, which are the strong muscles that close the two halves of the shell and which tightly hold the clam's shell in the shut position. "Salvage" is typically ground up for use in chowders, sauces, and dips, and is commercially available either in cans or frozen. Locally it is available fresh. The substantial "belly" of the clam is used by some fishermen as bait for striped bass and other species.

References

Mactridae
Marine molluscs of North America
Molluscs of the Atlantic Ocean
Molluscs of the United States
Fauna of the Northeastern United States
Fauna of the Southeastern United States
Bivalves described in 1817
Edible molluscs